Mohamed Khairuzzaman is a retired Bangladesh Army officer and former diplomat, who served as Bangladesh's Ambassador to Malaysia.

Career
He served in the Bangladesh Army, retiring with the rank of Major. He was placed in the foreign service after the Assassination of Sheikh Mujib. He was the ambassador of Bangladesh to the Philippines in 1996 when he was recalled by the Bangladesh Awami League government when he was named accused in the case over the Jail Killing in 1975 of Syed Nazrul Islam, Tajuddin Ahmad, Muhammad Mansur Ali, and Abul Hasnat Muhammad Qamaruzzaman. He was arrested when he returned to Bangladesh.

In 2001 he was in jail charged with involvement in the Assassination of Sheikh Mujibur Rahman, the first president of Bangladesh. He was released when the Bangladesh Nationalist Party and Bangladesh Jamaat-e-Islami government came to power. He was given the rank of Additional Secretary in the foreign ministry. He was made the ambassador to Malaysia. In 2004 he was acquitted in the Jail Killing by a lower court in Bangladesh.

When Bangladesh Awami League came to power in 2009 they recalled him back. He asked for leave but that was turned down by the government. The government of Bangladesh appointed AKM Atiqur Rahman to replace him as the ambassador. He has since refused to return to Bangladesh and has applied to stay in Malaysia under the "Malaysia My Second Home" program. He has been arrested by Malaysian immigration police on 9 February 2022 from his residence in Ampang area in Kuala Lumpur. Malaysian authorities said that it was due to an offence committed and following a request by his home country Bangladesh.

References

Living people
Bangladesh Army officers
Assassination of Sheikh Mujibur Rahman
Ambassadors of Bangladesh to the Philippines
High Commissioners of Bangladesh to Malaysia
Year of birth missing (living people)